Events in the year 2022 in Burundi.

Incumbents 

 President: Évariste Ndayishimiye
 Prime Minister: Alain-Guillaume Bunyoni (until 7 September); Gervais Ndirakobuca onwards

Events 
Ongoing — COVID-19 pandemic in Burundi

 3 May - At least 30 Burundian peacekeepers are killed and 20 more injured during an al-Shabaab attack at an African Union military base in Lower Shabelle, Somalia.
 27 July - The Burundi Human Rights Initiative (BHRI) accuses Burundi of sending troops into the Democratic Republic of the Congo (DRC) to fight the RED-Tabara, a Burundian armed opposition group. The BHRI also accuses Burundi of supporting armed groups that oppose the DRC.
 7 September - Gervais Ndirakobuca becomes the new prime minister of Burundi, following unanimous approval by the National Assembly.

Deaths 

 23 July – Venant Bacinoni, 82, Roman Catholic prelate.

References 

 
2020s in Burundi
Years of the 21st century in Burundi
Burundi
Burundi